Yaborova is a rural locality (a village) in Krasnovishersky District, Perm Krai, Russia. The population was 40 as of 2010. There are 3 streets.

Geography 
Yaborova is located 18 km south of Krasnovishersk (the district's administrative centre) by road. Ivachina is the nearest rural locality.

References 

Rural localities in Krasnovishersky District